Batman Unlimited is an action figure line produced by Mattel based on Batman. It inspired a series of direct-to-video animated films and online shorts.

Toys
The toy series debuted in 2015, taking the name from a discontinued 2013 line of toys.

Films
Batman Unlimited: Animal Instincts (May 2015) – Gotham is plagued by crime committed by an animal-themed villain squad, The "Animalitia" composed of Penguin, Silverback, Cheetah, Killer Croc, and Man-Bat. Alas, Batman, Red Robin, Nightwing, Green Arrow, and the Flash must band together to stop them.
Batman Unlimited: Monster Mayhem (August 2015) – It's Halloween night in Gotham City and Scarecrow, Clayface, Silver Banshee and Solomon Grundy have hit the streets to stir up trouble. Batman is on the trail of the city's spookiest villains while, further complicating matters, the clown prince of crime himself, the Joker, is ruling over this mysterious crew of misfit criminals. It's up to the Dark Knight to stop this gruesome gang before they unleash "digital laughter", a computer virus that's part of a diabolical plan to jeopardize all of Gotham City's vital technology. Batman, Green Arrow, Cyborg, Nightwing and Red Robin join the forces to battle the villains and save the city.
Batman Unlimited: Mechs vs. Mutants (September 2016) – When evil scientist Mr. Freeze activates his latest invention on two of Gotham City's most formidable criminals—Killer Croc and Bane—things go from bad to worse. Turning them into super-sized mutant monsters, the super-villains start bashing through the streets of Gotham City with no end in sight. It's up to the Caped Crusader and his Super Hero team to save the day by putting the giant robot mechs in their place—but it will be an uphill battle as they face off against enormous foes.

Webseries
A webseries began airing on DC Kids' YouTube channel on May 4, 2015. Kabillion currently broadcasts the series.  Currently, this series is available on Tubi.

Episodes

Season one

Season two

References

External links
 DC Kids page

Batman Unlimited (film series)
Batman toys
DC Comics action figure lines
2010s toys
Animated Batman television series
Television shows based on Mattel toys
DC Comics franchises